"Malbrough s'en va-t-en guerre" (Marlborough has left for the war), also known as "Mort et convoi de l'invincible Malbrough" (The death and burial of the invincible Marlborough), is a popular folk song in French.

History
The burlesque lament on the death of John Churchill, 1st Duke of Marlborough (1650–1722) was written on a false rumour of that event after the Battle of Malplaquet in 1709, the bloodiest battle of the War of the Spanish Succession. It tells how Marlborough's wife, awaiting his return from battle, is given the news of her husband's death. It also tells that he was buried and that a nightingale sang over his grave.

For years it was only known traditionally, and does not appear among the many anecdotic songs printed in France during the middle of the 18th century. Beaumarchais used the tune in his 1778 play The Marriage of Figaro for a despairing love song for Cherubino. In 1780 it became very popular. For instance, the tune concludes a sonata (in D-major) for viola d'amore and viola composed by Carl Stamitz in 1780 while in Paris. And it happened that when Louis XVII of France was born in 1785 (son of Louis XVI and Marie Antoinette and heir to the French throne) he was wet-nursed by a peasant named Geneviève Poitrine. The nurse, whilst rocking the royal cradle, sang "Marlborough s'en va-t-en guerre". The name, the simplicity of the words, and the melodiousness of the tune, interested the queen, and she frequently sang it. Everybody repeated it after her, including the king. The song was sung in the state apartments of Versailles, in the kitchens and in the stables – it became immensely popular.

From the court it was adopted by the tradespeople of Paris, and it passed from town to town, and country to country. It became as popular in England as in France. Johann von Goethe came to hate Marlborough simply on account of the prevalence of the tune he encountered during travels in France. It also became popular in Spain due to the Bourbon dynasty's influence on Spanish nobility. The name of Marlborough was modified to an easier to pronounce Mambrú. It was sung by children while playing Hopscotch (Rayuela). The Spanish guitarist and composer Fernando Sor (1778–1839) created a series of variations for guitar on the theme. It then spread to Latin America.

The rage endured for many years, slowly fading after the French Revolution, although, it is said that Napoleon liked to hum the tune, for instance when crossing the Memel (June 1812) at the beginning of his fatal Russian campaign.
The melody also became widely popular in the United Kingdom. By the mid-19th century it was being sung with the words "For He's a Jolly Good Fellow", often at all-male social gatherings. By 1862, these lyrics were already familiar in America. From this version, the melody also became the tune for a popular American campfire tune The Bear Went Over the Mountain.

The song has been translated into several languages, including an English version published by the American poet Henry Wadsworth Longfellow in the 19th century.

Melody

Verses
Malbrough s'en va-t-en guerre,
mironton, mironton, mirontaine,
Malbrough s'en va-t-en guerre,
Ne sait quand reviendra.
 

Il reviendra-z-à Pâques,
mironton, mironton, mirontaine,
Il reviendra-z-à Pâques,
ou à la Trinité.
 

La Trinité se passe,
mironton, mironton, mirontaine,
la Trinité se passe,
Malbrough ne revient pas.

Madame à sa tour monte,
mironton, mironton, mirontaine,
Madame à sa tour monte
si haut qu'elle peut monter.

Elle voit venir son page,
mironton, mironton, mirontaine,
elle voit venir son page,
tout de noir habillé.

Beau page, mon beau page,
mironton, mironton, mirontaine,
beau page, mon beau page,
quelles nouvelles apportez?

Aux nouvelles que j'apporte,
mironton, mironton, mirontaine,
aux nouvelles que j'apporte,
vos beaux yeux vont pleurer!

Quittez vos habits roses,
mironton, mironton, mirontaine,
quittez vos habits roses,
et vos satins brodés!

Monsieur Malbrough est mort.
mironton, mironton, mirontaine,
Monsieur Malbrough est mort.
Est mort et enterré.

Je l'ai vu porter en terre,
mironton, mironton, mirontaine,
Je l'ai vu porter en terre, 
par quatre-z-officiers.

L'un portait sa cuirasse
mironton, mironton, mirontaine,
l'un portait sa cuirasse
l'autre son bouclier.

L'autre portait son grand sabre,
mironton, mironton, mirontaine,
L'autre portait son grand sabre,
et l'autre ne portait rien.

On planta sur sa tombe
mironton, mironton, mirontaine,
on planta sur sa tombe
un beau rosier fleuri.

La cérémonie faite,
mironton, mironton,c mirontaine,
la cérémonie faite
chacun s'en fut coucher.

Alors autour de sa tombe
Mironton, mironton, mirontaine
Alors autour de sa tombe
Romarins l'on planta.

Sur la plus haute branche
Un rossignol chanta
On vit voler son âme,
Au travers des lauriers.

Chacun mit ventre à terre,
Mironton, mironton, mirontaine
Chacun mit ventre à terre,
Et puis se releva.
Marlborough the Prince of Commanders
Is gone to war in Flanders,
His fame is like Alexander's,
But when will he ever come home?
Mironton, mironton, mirontaine.

Perhaps at Trinity Feast, or
Perhaps he may come at Easter,
Egad! he had better make haste or
We fear he may never come home.
Mironton etc.

For Trinity Feast is over, 
And has brought no news from Dover,
And Easter is pass'd moreover,
And Marlborough still delays.

Milady in her watch-tower
Spends many a pensive hour,
Not knowing why or how her
Dear lord from England stays.

While sitting quite forlorn in
That tower, she spies returning
A page clad in deep mourning,
With fainting steps and slow.

"O page, prithee come faster!
What news do you bring of your master?
I fear there is some disaster,
Your looks are so full of woe."

"The news I bring fair lady,"
With sorrowful accent said he,
"Is one you are not ready
So soon, alas! to hear.

"But since to speak I'm hurried,"
Added this page, quite flurried,
"Marlborough is dead and buried!"
And here he shed a tear.

"He's dead! He's dead as a herring!
For I beheld his berring,
And four officers transferring
His corpse away from the field.

"One officer carried his sabre,
And he carried it not without labour,
Much envying his next neighbour,
Who only bore a shield.

"The third was helmet bearer –
That helmet which in its wearer
Fill'd all who saw it with terror,
And cover'd a hero's brains.

"Now, having got so far, I
Find that – by the Lord Harry!
The fourth is left nothing to carry.
So there the thing remains."
Mironton, mironton, mirontaine.

In popular culture
The song is one of several contemporary tunes that are played by the musical box of the Negress head clock, made in Paris in 1784. Rita Dove references the song and the clock in her 2009 poem "Ode on a Negress Head Clock, with Eight Tunes".

Ludwig van Beethoven used the tune to represent the French in his musical work Wellington's Victory.

Footnotes

Further reading

External links

 "Mort et convoi de l'invincible Malbrough", score
 Original French song and its German version
 Original French song and its English version

1709 songs
Cultural depictions of John Churchill, Duke of Marlborough
French folk songs
French-language songs
Songs about military officers
Songs based on actual events
Songs by war
War of the Spanish Succession